The Administration Act 1969 is an Act of Parliament passed in New Zealand in 1969 that regulates the administration of wills and trust.

References

External links
Text of the Act

Statutes of New Zealand